Pocket LOOX was a series of Pocket PC-based personal digital assistants (PDAs) and navigation systems developed by Fujitsu Siemens. It was discontinued in 2007.

Product comparison charts

Fujitsu Siemens Pocket LOOX PDAs

Pocket LOOX 600 was a first PDA by Fujitsu Siemens, and HTC, released in 2002. It had a built-in Bluetooth module and two expansion slots, SD/MMC and CF. Fujitsu Siemens later released GPRS expansion module that provides mobile phone functionality.

Pocket LOOX 600 can be upgraded to Windows Mobile 2003.

Fujitsu Siemens Pocket LOOX navigation system

Pocket LOOX navigation systems were powered by Navigon MobileNavigator|6s.  There were 9 maps supplied with device, covering 37 European countries. Main difference between N100 and N110 is that N100 did not have any built-in user accessible memory, but came with 1 GB Mini SD card. N110 on the other hand had 2 GB built-in memory and a free Mini SD expansion slot.

Alternative operating systems

It is possible to run Linux on Pocket LOOX 600. The latest supported version of Linux kernel is 2.4.19. Linux is loaded from a CF card, allowing a return to PocketPC 2002. But during restart, all contents of RAM are erased. To prevent data loss, users should backup RAM before restarting to Linux.

Work is being done to port Android to Pocket Loox 720. A port of Android 2.2 is running on the 720. It is possible to boot from either CF or SD cards; as mentioned above, a backup of all data is highly recommended.

See also
Fujitsu Siemens Computers
List of Fujitsu products
Personal digital assistant
Windows Mobile
Pocket PC

References 

Windows Mobile Classic devices
Mobile computers
Personal digital assistants
Windows CE devices